Rugova or Rugovo may refer to:

 Rugova Canyon, a canyon in Kosovo
 Rugova (region), an ethnographic region near Peć in Kosovo
 Rugovo (sword dance), a traditional sword dance of the above region
 Ibrahim Rugova, a politician